Lliedi is an electoral ward for Llanelli Town Council and Carmarthenshire County Council in Llanelli, Wales. 

The ward is in the far north of Llanelli, bounded to the west by Old Road and to the south by James Street. The River Lliedi runs through the middle of the ward. The population of this ward at the 2011 census was 5,457.

Representation
Lliedi was an electoral ward to Dyfed County Council, electing a Labour Party councillor at the 1989 election and a Liberal Democrat councillor at the 1993 elections.

Since 1995 Lliedi has been an electoral ward to Carmarthenshire County Council, electing two county councillors.

Lliedi is also one of the community wards to Llanelli Town Council, electing five town councillors.

Shahana Najmi was elected as one of the Labour county councillors at the 2017 elections, but left the Labour Party in 2019 to sit as an Independent councillor. In October 2021 she joined the Conservative Party, therefore represented Lliedi as a Tory. 

Rob James, one of the Labour county councillors elected in 2017, became leader of the county council's Labour Group.

References

Llanelli
Carmarthenshire electoral wards